Mikaela Åhlin-Kottulinsky (born 13 November 1992 in Karlstad) is a Swedish racing driver currently competing in the Extreme E Championship for Rosberg X Racing.

Career

Early career
Åhlin-Kottulinsky started racing at the age of 12 in go-karts. In the autumn of 2011, she stepped up to touring car racing when she took part in the FIA Women in Motorsport's shoot-out, where she finished second and got the chance to race in the Volkswagen Scirocco R-Cup in 2012.

Volkswagen Scirocco R Cup
She raced in the series for three seasons, and in 2014 she became the first woman in history to win a race in a Volkswagen-supported championship. 
At the end of 2014, Volkswagen decided to end their one-make cup racing series, with Audi Sport taking their place and launching the Audi Sport TT Cup. 165 drivers applied for the series, and 18 drivers where chosen to compete in the cup, with Åhlin-Kottulinsky being one of them. Her best result in 2015 was a third place at the Norisring, with two fastest laps set during the course of the season. 
From 2016 until her switch to the STCC, she raced in the German ADAC GT Masters series, competing in an Audi R8 LMS.

STCC TCR Scandinavia Touring Car Championship
In 2017, she joined the STCC, driving for PWR Racing - Junior Team in an Audi RS 3 LMS, even though the rest of her team competed with SEAT León TCRs, as she was under an Audi contract as part of the Audi Sport racing academy.

In 2018, in her second season in the STCC, she became the first female racing driver in Swedish touring car history to win a race, taking victory in the second heat at Karlskoga in August until all cars of the PWR Racing team were excluded later that evening following a protest from their rivals, who claimed they were running with non-regulation exhausts. The team appealed the exclusion and won their case a month later, with Åhlin-Kottulinsky's victory reinstated.

Åhlin-Kottulinsky re-signed with PWR Racing for the 2019 TCR Scandinavia Touring Car Championship, a replacement series for the STCC following the organisers' bankruptcy over the winter. She made history again as she claimed the first pole position for a female driver at the opening round of the season at Knutstorp, going on to win the first race of the season, claiming her second career victory in Swedish touring cars. She went on to finish the season sixth in the drivers' championship standings, taking a further four podium finishes over the course of the season.

For 2020, she again re-signed with PWR Racing to compete in the STCC TCR Scandinavia season, racing the brand new Cupra Leon Competición. She finished the season 9th with 2 podiums.

In 2021 she finished 2nd in the standings to her teammate Robert Dahlgren, again driving the PWR Racing Cupra León Competición.

In 2022 after announcing her Extreme E contract with Rosberg X Racing she confirmed that she will not be racing in with PWR, but may pursue other racing program opportunities, as she wants to "race more than the five Extreme E events" she currently has.

Extreme E
In 2021 she raced with Jenson Button's JBXE team in the Extreme E championship with Kevin Hansen. They finished the season in 3rd place overall. 

On 4 February 2022 she was announced as Rosberg X Racing's driver alongside fellow Swede and 4x FIA World Rallycross Champion Johan Kristoffersson. They won the first round of the season in Neom, Saudi Arabia.

Personal life 
Åhlin-Kottulinsky comes from a racing family. Mikaela's grandfather was Silesian Count Freddy Kottulinsky, who won the 1980 Paris-Dakar Rally. Her father, Jerry Åhlin, raced between 1983 and 1991 in the European Rally Championship and between 1984 and 2000 took part in six WRC races in which he scored one point. Her mother, Susanne Kottulinsky, participated between 1982 and 2002 in the European Rally Championship with Opel, Volvo, Audi, and her younger brother, Fredrik Åhlin, is a rally driver.

Åhlin-Kottulinsky dated Formula One driver Max Verstappen while he was racing for Toro Rosso. Their relationship ended in 2016.

Racing record

Career summary 

† Non-championship event.
* Season still in progress.

Complete Volkswagen Scirocco R-Cup results 
(key) (Races in bold indicate pole position; races in italics indicate fastest lap)

Complete Audi Sport TT Cup results 
(key) (Races in bold indicate pole position) (Races in italics indicate fastest lap)

Complete ADAC GT Masters results 
(key) (Races in bold indicate pole position) (Races in italics indicate fastest lap)

Complete Scandinavian Touring Car Championship results 
(key) (Races in bold indicate pole position) (Races in italics indicate fastest lap)

Complete Extreme E results
(key)

* Season still in progress.

References

External links 
 Official website
 
 Mikaela Åhlin-Kottulinsky profile on Motorsport.com
 Mikaela Åhlin-Kottulinsky on Instagram

1992 births
Living people
Sportspeople from Karlstad
Swedish racing drivers
Swedish female racing drivers
ADAC GT Masters drivers
Extreme E drivers
Swedish Touring Car Championship drivers
Team Rosberg drivers
Audi Sport TT Cup drivers